Matthew Cameron (born 20 September 1985) is an Australian Paralympic athletics competitor. He competed at the 2008 Summer Paralympics. At the 2012 Summer Paralympics, he won a bronze medal.

Personal
Cameron was born on 20 September 1985 and is from Wakerley, Queensland. He carried the Paralympic torch during the 2000 Summer Paralympics torch relay. He was named the 2003 Townsville's Australian Sportsperson of the Year. He attended the Barrier Reef Institute of TAFE, where he earned a certificates in business and computer aided drafting. , he works as a compliance enforcement officer and lived in Wynnum, Queensland.

Cameron has popliteal web syndrome, a condition he has had since birth. He has had twenty-five surgeries as a result of the syndrome and he cannot stand.

Wheelchair basketball
Cameron has played wheelchair basketball and represented Australia as a member of the Australia men's national under-20 wheelchair basketball team. In 2004, he had a wheelchair basketball scholarship from the North Queensland Sports Foundation.

Athletics

Cameron is a T54 competitor, competing in 100 metres, 200 metres, and 400 metres events. He started competing in 2005, and first represented Australia in 2006.

Cameron competed in the 2006 IPC World Championship in the men's T54 100 metres, 200 metres, and 400 metres events. He competed at the 2008 Summer Paralympics in the 100m and 4 x 100-metre relay team events.  He missed the finals in the 100m event by one spot.  His relay team was disqualified after he fell from his chair during the transition. He competed in the 2011 City2Surf. At the 2011 Australian Athletics Championships, he finished second in the 200-metre wheelchair race final. He finished first in the 100-metre race. He was selected to represent Australia at the 2012 Summer Paralympics in athletics in the 100-metre event.

At the 2012 Summer Paralympics Cameron participated in the Men's 100 m T54 and Men's 4 × 400 m T53/54 events, winning a bronze in the 4 × 400 m.

References

External links
 
 
 Matthew Cameron at Australian Athletics Historical Results

Paralympic athletes of Australia
Athletes (track and field) at the 2012 Summer Paralympics
Athletes (track and field) at the 2008 Summer Paralympics
Paralympic bronze medalists for Australia
Living people
1985 births
Medalists at the 2012 Summer Paralympics
Paralympic medalists in athletics (track and field)
20th-century Australian people
21st-century Australian people